Brothers Rugby Club is an Australian rugby union club that is based in Roseville, New South Wales, Sydney.

History

Brothers was formed by Old Boys of St Pius X College, Chatswood in 1947 and was at that time known as Christian Brothers Old Boys or CBOB’s.

In 2005, it was decided to change the club name from CBOB’s to the very familiar "Brothers" Rugby Club Sydney. "Brothers" is one of the most well known rugby brands in Australia.

Brothers are affiliated to the five Brothers clubs in Queensland including Brothers Old Boys, Brisbane and also Brothers Joondalup in Western Australia. Brothers are also affiliated to the Marist Rugby Federation in New Zealand, Tonga, Fiji and Samoa, numbering approximately 40 clubs in all.

Recent seasons

In the 2011 season, Brothers Rugby won both first and second grade grand finals and the Division 4 club championship, granting them promotion to Division 3 of Subbies. Brothers won the first grade Grand Final in 2012, and narrowly lost Grand Finals in Second Grade and Colts. All this while winning the Club Championship and promotion to Division 2 of Subbies.

In 2015 Brothers played in Division 1, but were relegated for the 2016 season.

Roll Of Honour

Life Members
There are 23 life members of the club:

 Terry Mico
 David Mico*
 Bob Towers
 Brian Hadlee*
 Ian Meers
 John Sullivan
 John Andrews
 Michael Lowry

 John Waugh
 Martin Nichols
 Barry Williams
 Brian McElvogue
 John Punch (Snr)
 Paul Muller
 Steve Jaques
 Michael Williams

 Tony Padovan
 Adrian Brannan
 Robert Bruce
 Damian Henry
 Tom Burns
 Andy Losurdo
 Michael “Pickle” Wren (Founding Member of the 400 Club)

Presidents

See also
New South Wales Suburban Rugby Union
New South Wales Rugby Union
Australian Rugby Union
Rugby union in Australia

References

External links
NSW Subbies website
Brothers Official Website

Rugby clubs established in 1947
1947 establishments in Australia
Rugby union teams in Sydney
Roseville, New South Wales